Religionym (from  / religion, and  / name) and confessionym (from  / confession, and  / name) are polysemic terms, and neologisms, that have several distinctive meanings, generally related (from the semantic point of view) to religious (confessional) terminology, but are (in their specific meanings) defined and used differently among scholars. As a consequence of a wide variety of uses, specific meanings of those terms can be mutually distinctive, but also overlapping. Some scholars have used one or the other term as designations for a particular onomastic class that encompasses the proper names of religions and cults (like: Hinduism, Buddhism, Christianity, Islam), while others have used the same terms (one or the other) as names for a particular anthroponymic class, encompassing the proper names that designate religious adherents (like: Hindus, Buddhists, Christians, Muslims). In scholarly literature, both terms (religionym and confessionym) are sometimes also used in much broader meaning, as designations for all terms that are semantically related to religious (confessional) terminology.

In the English-speaking world, lexical corpus that encompasses various words, terms and expressions that are related to the religious sphere of life is most commonly referred to as religious lexis, or religious lexicon. Those linguistic terms cover all of those widest meanings that were occasionally assigned (by some authors) to the terms religionym and confessionym, thus relieving them of such general uses, and consequently allowing the standardization of more specific uses for both of those terms.

In recent years, several scholarly attempts were made in order to differentiate between the existing uses, and thus define the preferred meanings of those terms, but no general agreement has been reached among scholars, and the use of both terms continues to depend on the context given to them by individual authors, in accordance with their preferred terminological traditions.

The problem of linguistic standardization of various neologisms (like religionym and confessionym) is generally related to the wider question of proper formation and use of onomastic terms. Such issues have gained importance in scholarly circles, since international surveys among experts revealed the existence of similar challenging issues, related to the process of terminological standardization within the field.

See also
 Onomastics
 Lexical semantics
 Endonym and exonym
 Ethnonym

References

Sources

 
 
 
 
 
 
 
 
 
 
 
 
 

Onomastics
Religion
Definitions
Neologisms